The Jacob Tueller Sr. House, at 165 E. 1st South in Paris, Idaho, was listed on the National Register of Historic Places in 1982.

It is a two-story buff brick house with outset quoins.  The two stories are separated by a decorative outset band consisting of two rows of brick sandwiching a toothed brick row.  Wooden decoration includes Tuscan porch columns.

The Jacob Tueller Jr. House, at 75 S. 1st East in Paris, was NRHP-listed at the same time.

References

Houses on the National Register of Historic Places in Idaho
Queen Anne architecture in Idaho
Houses completed in 1904
Bear Lake County, Idaho